Gene Norman Presents Mel Tormé at the Crescendo is a 1957 live album by Mel Tormé, recorded at The Crescendo nightclub in Los Angeles.

Track listing 
 "It's Only a Paper Moon" (Harold Arlen, Yip Harburg, Billy Rose) – 3:22
 "What Is This Thing Called Love?" (Cole Porter) – 3:55
 "One for My Baby (and One More for the Road)" (Arlen, Johnny Mercer) – 4:47
 "Love Is Just a Bug" (Specs Powell) – 2:32
 "A Nightingale Sang in Berkeley Square" (Eric Maschwitz, Manning Sherwin) – 2:53
 "Autumn Leaves" (Joseph Kosma, Mercer, Jacques Prévert) – 1:32
 "Just One of Those Things" (Porter) – 2:29
 "The Girl Next Door" (Ralph Blane, Hugh Martin) – 2:58
 "Lover, Come Back to Me" (Oscar Hammerstein II, Sigmund Romberg) – 2:43
 "Looking at You" (Porter) – 2:50
 "(Love Is) The Tender Trap" (Sammy Cahn, Jimmy Van Heusen) – 3:26
 "I'm Beginning to See the Light" (Duke Ellington, Don George, Johnny Hodges, Harry James) – 2:23

Personnel 
 Mel Tormé - vocals
 Marty Paich - piano, arranger
 Larry Bunker - vibraphone
 Don Fagerquist - trumpet
 Max Bennett - double bass
 Mel Lewis - drums

References 

Mel Tormé live albums
Albums arranged by Marty Paich
1957 live albums
Bethlehem Records live albums